"Mar de Amor" also known "Regálame un Beso" (Give me a Kiss), is a song by Colombian recording artist Fanny Lu to promote the Mexican soap opera Mar de amor. It was written and produced by José Gaviria and was included in the deluxe edition from her second studio album Dos. The song was released on June 21, 2010 only in Mexico. Lu was nominated in the category Best Musical Theme for the soap opera Mar de Amor.

Track listing

Charts

Accolades

References

2010 singles
Spanish-language songs
Fanny Lu songs
Universal Music Latino singles
2010 songs
Songs written by José Gaviria
Songs written by Fanny Lu